Staring is a prolonged gaze or fixed look. In staring, one object or person is the continual focus of visual interest, for an amount of time. Staring can be interpreted as being either hostile like disapproval of another's behavior, or the result of intense concentration, interest or affection. Staring behavior can be considered as a form of aggression like when it is an invasion of an individual's privacy in certain contexts, or as a nonverbal cue to convey feelings of attraction in a social setting. The resultant behavior or action defines whether it is aggressive in nature (e.g. leering that results in street harassment), passive or active expression of attraction, etc. However, to some extent staring often occurs accidentally, and often a person would be simply staring into a space for awareness, or could be lost in thought, stupefied, or be unable to see. As such, the meaning of a person's staring behavior depends upon the attributions made by the observer.

In a staring contest, a mutual staring can take the form of a battle of wills. When eye contact is reciprocated, it could be an aggressive-dominating game where the loser is the person who looks away first.

Staring conceptually also implies confronting the inevitable – 'staring death in the face', or 'staring into the abyss'. Group staring evokes and emphasizes paranoia; such as the archetypal stranger walking into a saloon in a Western to be greeted by the stares of all the regulars.  The fear of being stared at is called scopophobia.

Social factors

Children have to be socialised into learning acceptable staring behaviour. This is often difficult because children have different sensitivities to self-esteem. Staring is also sometimes used as a technique of flirting with an object of affection. However, being stared at, especially for a prolonged amount of time or very frequently by one person in particular, can cause discomfort to those subjected to it.

Jean-Paul Sartre discusses "The look" in Being and Nothingness, in which the appearance of someone else creates a situation in which a person's subjectivity is transformed without their consent.

Psychological study
The act of staring implies a visual focus, where the subject of the gaze is objectified. This has been the subject of psychoanalytical studies on the nature of scopophilia, with a subsequent development in some aspects of feminist thought (see film, photography and voyeurism). Paradoxically, the notion of staring also implicates the looker in constructing themselves as a subject. Sartre was interested in the individual experiencing shame only when they perceive that their shameful act is being witnessed by another (see The look).

Staring contests

A staring contest is a game in which two people stare into each other's eyes and attempt to maintain eye contact for a longer period than their opponent can. The game ends when one participant looks away, or smiles.

There is a popular variation of the game in which the participants must also not blink, creating a physical as well as a psychological challenge. Most other variations revolve chiefly around either of these two core objectives, with some allowing the aggressive use of distracting actions to force an opponent into defeat, while others prohibit virtually any action but staring.

Another commonly accepted ruleset is the 'ambush' ruleset, where one participant begins the contest without the opponent initially being aware of it. As soon as eye contact is made, the staring contest has begun, and proceeds according to regular conventions. The contest is allowed to pass without the opponent being aware they were involved.

Staring contests ('Stare-out') were featured as an animation in the first series of surreal BBC television comedy sketch show Big Train (aired in 1998). The animation satirised televised sporting events coverage and its over-excited commentary, inspired by events such as the World Chess Championship, cricket, boxing and the football World Cup. The sketches are set during the World Stare-out Championship Finals, a staring match which is described as a global event broadcast all over the world. 

In season two, episode four of the Cartoon Network animated sitcom Regular Show, the main villain, "Peeps" (who is a large floating eyeball), is defeated by losing a staring contest.

See also
Stare-in-the-crowd effect
 Thousand-yard stare

References

External links

 43rd World Stare Out Championship Finals

Visual perception
Attention
Human behavior